The Silence=Death Project, best known for its iconic political poster, was the work of a six-person collective in New York City: Avram Finkelstein, Brian Howard, Oliver Johnston, Charles Kreloff, Chris Lione, and Jorge Soccarás.

Formation 
Avram Finkelstein founded the Silence=Death project in 1987 with Jorge Socarras, Chris Lione, Charles Kreloff, Oliver Johnston, and Brian Howard during the AIDS crisis as a consciousness-raising group, and as a means of mutual support. The content of their discussions quickly turned political. Inspired by posters made by the Art Workers Coalition and the Guerrilla Girls, the group decided to create their own poster to be wheatpasted around New York City. Rejecting any photographic image as necessarily exclusionary, the group decided to use more abstract language in an attempt to reach multiple audiences. They created the Silence=Death poster using the title phrase and a pink triangle, known from its association with the persecution of homosexuals in Nazi Germany in the 1930s and 1940s.

The first printing of the poster contained several errors in the smaller text at the bottom. Two government agencies (the CDC and the FDA) were spelled out as "The Center for Disease Control" as opposed to the "Centers" and it also read "Federal Drug Administration" instead of "Food and Drug Administration". The poster originally hit the streets in mid-March 1987, less than a month before ACT UP (AIDS Coalition to Unleash Power) was formed. The Collective eventually turned the rights of the poster to ACT UP who reprinted it, first without making any changes, but then reprinted it, again, with the correct names of the government agencies.

ACT UP 
The Silence=Death poster was also used by the AIDS Coalition to Unleash Power (ACT UP) as a central image in their activist campaign against the AIDS epidemic. Because of ACT UP's advocacy, the pink triangle remains synonymous with AIDS activism. In 2017, the image was reinstalled in the windows of the Leslie Lohman Museum of Gay and Lesbian Art with a new line at the bottom: "Be Vigilant. Refuse. Resist."

See also
 AIDS–Holocaust metaphor

References 

LGBT history in the United States
LGBT rights in the United States
HIV/AIDS activism
1987 in LGBT history